Giorgio Favaro (5 January 1944 – 8 December 2002) was an Italian racing cyclist, who competed as a professional from 1966 to 1975.

Major results

1966
 5th Overall Tour de l'Avenir
1st  Mountains classification
1st Stage 9
1967
 3rd Giro di Romagna
 3rd GP Montelupo
1968
 1st Stage 5 Tirreno–Adriatico
1969
 1st Giro di Toscana
1971
 3rd Gran Piemonte
 3rd Giro delle Tre Provincie
 5th Overall Tour de la Nouvelle-France
1972
 1st Stage 4 Tour de Romandie

Grand Tour general classification results timeline

References

External links

1944 births
2002 deaths
Italian male cyclists
Cyclists from the Province of Padua